Lytta auriculata, the red-eared blister beetle, is a species of blister beetles in the family Meloidae. It is found in Central America and North America.

References

 Selander, Richard B. (1960). "Bionomics, Systematics, and Phylogeny of Lytta, a Genus of Blister Beetles (Coleoptera, Meloidae)". Illinois Biological Monographs, no. 28, 295.

Further reading

 Arnett, R. H. Jr., M. C. Thomas, P. E. Skelley and J. H. Frank. (eds.). (21 June 2002). American Beetles, Volume II: Polyphaga: Scarabaeoidea through Curculionoidea. CRC Press LLC, Boca Raton, Florida .
 Arnett, Ross H. (2000). American Insects: A Handbook of the Insects of America North of Mexico. CRC Press.
 Richard E. White. (1983). Peterson Field Guides: Beetles. Houghton Mifflin Company.

Meloidae
Beetles described in 1870